ComfortDelGro Corporation is a multi-national land transport company listed on the Singapore Exchange, operating about 35,000 vehicles in seven countries. It was formed on 29 March 2003 through a merger of Singapore-based land transport companies Comfort Group and DelGro Corporation.

On 17 September 2019, ComfortDelGro announced that it is listed on the Dow Jones Sustainability Asia Pacific Index in recognition of its sustainability efforts, thus becoming the first transport company in Singapore to do so.

History

Comfort Group Ltd 
National Trades Union Congress (NTUC) Co-operative Commonwealth for Transport (Comfort), was formed in 1970 as a social enterprise together with NTUC Income and NTUC Welcome. It targeted the problem of pirate or "ali baba" taxis which were rampant in Singapore at that time. Its business undertakings were acquired by Comfort Transportation Pte Ltd, a wholly owned subsidiary of Comfort. Comfort was subsequently listed on 6 June 1994. As of its merger in 2003, Comfort operated with a combined fleet of approximately 11,340 taxis. It was Singapore's largest private bus operator then with 401 buses on unscheduled routes.

DelGro Corporation Limited 
CityCab is DelGro group's taxi operations arm. CityCab started in 1995 with the merger of three companies – Singapore Airport Bus Service Ltd (SABS), Singapore Bus Service Taxi Pte Ltd (SBS Taxi Pte Ltd) and Singapore Commuter Pte Ltd. At the time of merger in 2003, DelGro group operated public bus services, taxis and car rental in Singapore, Malaysia, United Kingdom and the People's Republic of China. It ran 5,116 taxis while its listed subsidiary, SBS Transit was the largest scheduled bus operator with 2,872 buses. DelGro had also just been awarded the operation of the Northeast MRT line and the Sengkang/Punggol light rail system.

Merger 
Comfort and DelGro's merger was first proposed on 20 November 2002. In its Joint Announcement, the merger aimed to "consolidate the transportation businesses of the Companies in order to enhance profitability and shareholder value. At the same time it will enable NewCo [new company] to provide better customer service through synergies and greater efficiencies and to achieve increased size and scale for its overseas operations." It would also be "better placed to face the increased competition from the liberalisation of the unscheduled feeder bus services market in Singapore."

The merger had a market capitalisation of over $1 billion, combined sales of $1.56 billion, and pre-tax earnings of $196 million. It set to provide a spectrum of transport services ranging from bus and taxi services to leasing and vehicle maintenance and inspections.

The merger's only rival then was SMRT Corporation, which had a market capitalisation of around $930 million, sales of $500 million and pre-tax profits of $88.5 million then. Its fleet of some 600 buses and 2,000 taxis was smaller, but it was operating Singapore's rail network entirely.

Singapore operations

Bus and Rail

ComfortDelGro owns 75% of SBS Transit, which is listed separately on the Singapore Exchange. SBS Transit is a leading bus and rail operator in Singapore. Every day, it carries more than three million passengers on its extensive bus and rail network.

SBS Transit operates about 250 bus services with a fleet of more than 3,200 buses. The buses serve 17 interchanges and more than 3,500 bus stops island-wide. Additionally, SBS Transit operates the North East line, which is Singapore's first fully automated, underground heavy rail system that connects Punggol to HarbourFront, as well as the Sengkang and Punggol LRT line.

SBS Transit also operates the Downtown line. It is 42 km long with 34 stations, making it the longest underground line in Singapore. The first stage of the Downtown line commenced passenger service on 22 December 2013. The second and third stages were ready for passenger service on 27 December 2015 and 21 October 2017 respectively.

ComfortDelGro Bus, as a private-bus charter subsidiary, is the largest private land-transport company in Singapore, which offers a wide range of bus charter services, including employee and school bus services. It also offers overland bus services to West Malaysia, and operates premium bus services, complementing those offered by SBS Transit.

Taxi

Comfort and CityCab, both taxi companies belonging to ComfortDelGro Corporation, are the largest players in Singapore's taxi industry with a combined fleet of 16,600 taxis. The ComfortDelGro taxi booking system wirelessly connects the taxis using the General Packet Radio Service (GPRS) technology via the in-vehicle Mobile Data Terminals (MDTs). Today, its Customer Contact Centre caters to over 32 million taxi bookings annually. Comfort and CityCab also operate ComfortDelGro LimoCabs and MaxiCabs in its fleet.

CityCab was formed in 1995 from the merger of SABS (Singapore Airport Bus Services), SBS Taxi and Singapore Commuters.

Automotive Engineering
Besides servicing private cars through its SPARK Car Care business, ComfortDelGro Engineering provides accident repair for most of ComfortDelGro's taxi fleet, as well as vehicle fleets for ComfortDelGro Bus and ComfortDelGro Rent-A-Car. Its diesel sale department's 17 diesel kiosks provide diesel at subsidised rate to ComfortDelGro's 16,600-strong taxi fleet islandwide.

Its vehicle construction unit custom-builds vehicles for passenger transportation as well as for special function for both local and regional customers. It also provides modifications, retrofitting and refurbishment to existing vehicles. ComfortDelGro Engineering is also the authorised distributor for Volvo Buses in Singapore.

Inspection and Testing Services
VICOM is offering testing and inspection services to a wide spectrum of industries such as automotive, petrochemical, aerospace, manufacturing, building, construction, marine and gas.

Driving Centre
ComfortDelGro Driving Centre is a partnership with Chofu Driving School of Japan. The Centre provides driving instruction for motorcars, motorcycles, bus and taxi vocational licences as well as corporate training.

Car Rental
ComfortDelGro Rent-A-Car operates as a car-rental and leasing-service provider in Singapore with a fleet of more than 1,100 vehicles.

Insurance Broking Service
ComfortDelGro Insurance Brokers is an associate company of the Group, and its principal activities relate to risk protection and transfer solutions.
It proposes and implements solutions involving a blend of traditional insurance products, alternative risk financing instruments and methods to help the Group mitigate any risks faced in an increasingly complex environment.

Outdoor Advertising

Moove Media is the advertising arm of ComfortDelGro and has been in operations since 8 April 2005 through the merger of Comfort Ads and SBS Transit Advertising. It marked its launch with several large cows dotted across the island.

As of 2020, Moove Media offers an integrated outdoor advertisement platforms, reaching commuters islandwide, through:

Buses
 SBS Transit - buses & bus interchanges
 ComfortDelGro Bus

Rail
MRT & LRT lines operated by SBS Transit (with their respective stations inclusive):
 North East Line
 Downtown Line 
 Sengkang and Punggol LRT lines

Since 2011, Moove Media offers similar outdoor advertising services in Sydney and Melbourne, Australia.

Overseas operations

China
In China, the Group operates and manages an inter-city bus station, 
Tianhe Bus Station, in Guangzhou. Hengyang's CityCab Bus Services, in which the Group owns a 25% stake, operates 88 buses.

ComfortDelGro also operates taxi services in nine cities – Beijing, Shanghai, Shenyang, Chengdu, Hengyang, Suzhou, Nanning, Nanjing and Jilin City with a total fleet of about 10,650 vehicles.

Car Rental and Leasing
ComfortDelGro launched a motor vehicle rental and leasing business through a joint venture company, ComfortDelGro Rent-A-Car (Chengdu), in Chengdu, the gateway to the fast developing Western region of China. The Group established Nanning ComfortDelGro Rent-A-Car to operate car rental and leasing services in the city on 1 January 2008 with an initial fleet size of 13 cars, and this number has now doubled.

Driving Centre
ComfortDelGro has a joint venture company – Chengdu ComfortDelGro Qing Yang Driving School in Chengdu. The centre offers driving training, professional driver training and driver testing services to the Chinese.

In October 2006, the Group expanded its presence in China with its first move into Chongqing through a 90% stake in new joint venture driving school, Chongqing ComfortDelGro Driver Training Co., Ltd. It expanded its footprint with the acquisition of a site in Liangjiang for its Chongqing Liangjiang ComfortDelGro Driving Training driving school in April 2011, which is expected to be ready by the end of the year.

In September 2013, the Group further expanded its operations in Jilin City when its subsidiary, Jilin ComfortDelGro Taxi incorporated Jilin ComfortDelGro Driver Training Co., Ltd, a wholly owned driving school.

Vehicle Inspection Services
In 2004, ComfortDelGro acquired Chengdu Jitong Integrated Vehicle Inspection. Besides being a vehicle inspection centre, it also operates the sales of automotive parts and components in Chengdu. In the same year, it acquired Beijing Tian Long Da Tian Vehicle Inspection, which offers vehicle safety inspection and emission test services in Beijing.

United Kingdom

In March 2000, DelGro Corporation purchased the Metroline bus company in London. As of December 2012 it operated 1,200 buses. In June 2013, a further 494 buses were added to Metroline with the purchase of five depots located in North and West London from First London.

Under Transport for London (TfL)'s gross-cost model, operators like Metroline tender for routes and operate them as contractors. The Mayor of London decides on the level of fares as well as the concessions for certain passengers. All fare revenue goes to TfL. Fare revenue is then proportionately allocated to operators on a mileage basis and meeting the performance targets set in the contract.

ComfortDelGro also owns the Scottish Citylink express coach business in Scotland. In September 2005 ComfortDelGro entered into a joint venture with Stagecoach that combined Scottish Citylink with Stagecoach's Megabus operation in Scotland.

In May 2006, the Group acquired Onward Travel, a private car-hire business in Edinburgh, Scotland. It operates an exclusive airport taxi rank concession from Edinburgh Airport. In March 2007, the Group acquired another licensed-taxi and private-hire company in Birmingham. The company has since been renamed Computer Cab (Birmingham) Ltd.

In June 2015, ComfortDelGro was shortlisted to bid for the London Overground railway concession but lost out to Arriva Rail London.

In February 2018, the NAT Group in South Wales was purchased with 100+ buses for £13.4 million. ComfortDelGro has since replaced the existing Managing Director, with Adam Keen of Damory Coaches taking over in 2019.

Under ComfortDelGro, NAT Group has seen substantial expansion with a new rebrand, and also the termination of all overseas coach work due to the COVID-19 pandemic. NAT Group also operate the important Bristol to Chepstow 'Severn Express' link in joint partnership with TrawsCymru and Monmouthshire County Council, branded as the X7 from 15 June 2020.

In December 2021, ComfortDelGro purchased Megabus and the remaining 35% of Scottish Citylink from Stagecoach.

CityFleet Networks

ComfortDelGro also owns CityFleet Networks, which operates Westbus UK, as well as taxi services in a number of UK cities, including ComCab and Comfort Executive.
 Comcab, also known as Computer Cab, operates taxis in London, Edinburgh, Aberdeen and Liverpool, and operates a fleet of 6,300 radio taxis and private hire vehicles providing a service to local business and private customers.

CityFleets Network was previously a joint venture between ComfortDelGro (51%) and Australia-based Cabcharge Australia (49%) until June 2016, when ComfortDelGro purchased the 49% stake from Cabcharge.

Ireland
In Ireland, ComfortDelGro operates the Irish Citylink ComfortDelGro, an inter-city coach services with over 20 coaches in Dublin, Galway, Clifden and Cork.

Australia

ComfortDelGro Australia is ComfortDelGro's Australian subsidiary, and operates buses in New South Wales, Victoria, Queensland, Australian Capital Territory and Northern Territory. The subsidiary started out in 2005 as a joint venture between ComfortDelGro (51%) and Australian taxi company Cabcharge (49%) known as ComfortDelGro Cabcharge (CDC), to purchase Westbus and Hillsbus in Sydney and Hunter Valley Buses from National Express.

In August 2006, ComfortDelGro Cabcharge expanded purchasing the Western Sydney services of Baxter's Bus Lines followed in August 2007 by Morisett Bus Service, Sugar Valley Coachlines and Toronto Bus Service.

In November 2008, Kefford Corporation in Victoria was purchased followed in September 2012 by Queanbeyan-based Deane's Buslines and Transborder Express, the Melbourne bus services of Driver Group in July 2013 and the Blue Mountains Bus Company in August 2014. In February 2017, ComfortDelGro purchased Cabcharge's shares in the business with it rebranded ComfortDelGro Australia.

In 2018, ComfortDelGro acquired Tullamarine Bus Lines, National Patient Transport, Coastal Liner, Forest Coach Lines and Buslink. In May 2019 ComfortDelGro acquired Blanch's Bus Company and Brunswick Valley Coaches in the Northern Rivers region.

Additionally, Swan Taxis based in Perth became wholly owned by ComfortDelGro in 2010. Swan Taxis later acquired Metro WA Taxi in October 2017. Being wholly owned by ComfortDelGro since acquisition, Swan Taxis was never part of CDC.

Vietnam
In Ho Chi Minh City, ComfortDelGro owns 70% of Vietnam Taxi Company (Vinataxi), a joint venture with Vietnamese company Tracodi. It is currently the third largest market share in the taxi sector in the city, and operates a fleet of over 380 taxis. Vinataxi was set up in 1992 as a joint venture between Tracodi and Hong Kong company Tecobest Investment, until Tecobest sold its share of Vinataxi to ComfortDelGro in 2003.

Prior to March 2018, ComfortDelGro also had another joint venture with former state-owned enterprise Saigon General Service Corporation (Savico), known as ComfortDelGro Savico Taxi. It was established in 2005 and operated over 220 taxis, a call centre, as well as a workshop which repairs and maintains the taxi fleet. Tough competition with Uber and Grab, along with high costs due to constant improvement of its cars and service quality resulted in a decrease in profit to only VNĐ235 million (US$10,300) in 2017. Subsequently, ComfortDelGro Savico shut down in March 2018 and merged into Vinataxi later that year.

Malaysia
In Malaysia, ComfortDelGro offers car-leasing and rental services through CityLimo Leasing (M) Sdn Bhd. The Group currently operates about 230 vehicles in the Capital. In addition to leasing, the company also provides a round-the-clock mobile back-up service that offers assistance to customers in the event of an emergency.

France
In June 2020, ComfortDelGro entered into a collaboration agreement with RATP Dev and Alstom to jointly bid for contracts along Lines 16 and 17 of the Grand Paris Express in Paris.

New Zealand
In August 2021, Auckland One Rail, in which ComfortDelGro has a 50% shareholding, was awarded a contract by Auckland Transport to operate train services in Auckland starting from January 2022, lasting eight years initially with room for further extensions. This is the first overseas rail contract attained by ComfortDelGro and first by a Singapore company.

See also 
Transport in Singapore

References

External links
 
 

2003 establishments in Singapore
ComfortDelGro companies
Transport companies established in 2003
Singaporean companies established in 2003
Singaporean brands
Companies listed on the Singapore Exchange
Multinational companies headquartered in Singapore
Transport operators of Singapore
Mass Rapid Transit (Singapore)
Bus groups in the United Kingdom